Group Racing Developments, known more simply as GRD, was a short-lived British constructor of racing cars. It was formed in 1971 with a large percentage of staff coming from those made redundant from the closure of Lotus Cars customer car manufacturing arm. They built cars for Formula 2, Formula 3, Formula Atlantic and Sports 2000 racing classes until a decline in British racing vehicle manufacturing bit into the industry in 1975 that paralleled the oil crisis.

Cars

References

Defunct motor vehicle manufacturers of England
British racecar constructors
Vehicle manufacturing companies established in 1971
Vehicle manufacturing companies disestablished in 1975
Sports car manufacturers
British companies established in 1971
1971 establishments in England
Companies based in Norfolk
1975 disestablishments in England